Hua Chuan (华川) tanker is the first military/civilian dual use oil tanker built in the People’s Republic of China (PRC) for the People's Liberation Army Navy (PLAN). Built by Guangzhou Shipyard, the 6000 ton tanker first entered service in March 2013, and is usually deployed for civilian use in general. When activated for military use, it acts as a replenishment oiler (AOR), a mission it first performed on October 25, 2014, thus proving the design was successful. Specification:
Length: 110 meter
Beam: 11.6 meter
Tonnage: 6000 ton
Speed: 14.2 kt

References

Auxiliary ships of the People's Liberation Army Navy